Commissioner Barry C. Swanson (born April 4, 1950) is an American Salvation Army Officer who was commissioned as an Officer in The Salvation Army on June 11, 1978 and who was the 23rd Chief of the Staff of The Salvation Army under Salvation Army Generals Shaw Clifton and Linda Bond. He was succeeded by Andre Cox in February 2013. Swanson was also a candidate for the 20th General of The Salvation Army in August 2013, but he was not elected.

Work in The Salvation Army

Swanson was born in Chicago, Illinois attended Northern Illinois University where he earned a bachelor's degree in marketing. In 1975 he married Sue Miller. Together they entered the Salvation Army College for Officer Training in 1976. They held corps (church) appointments in Michigan & Minnesota. He served as the Divisional Commander of the Heartland division headquartered in Peoria, Illinois. After this appointment he was appointed the Territorial Program Secretary in 1999. His next appointment was as the Chief Secretary for the US Central Territory in 2003 and given the rank of Colonel.

Following this appointment he was appointed to National Headquarters as National Chief Secretary. In 2007 Commissioner Swanson came to International Headquarters as International Secretary and Zonal Secretary for the Americas and Caribbean zone, prior to being appointed to be the Territorial Commander in the USA Central Territory. He took the office of Chief of Staff on May 1, 2010 following the retirement of Commissioner Robin Dunster.

In February 2011 at the meeting of the High Council of the Salvation Army, Swanson was nominated to be the 19th General of The Salvation Army. He lost that election to Linda Bond, however. Swanson is now the territorial commander of the Salvation Army's Eastern Territory in the United States.

On 31 July 2013 Swanson was nominated as a candidate for the 20th general of the Salvation Army, but he lost the election to General Andre Cox.

Appointments

USA Central Territory

Corps (June 1977), DHQ (June 1990), Corps (July 1992), DHQ (June 1994)
Divisional Commander (August 1995)
Territorial Secretary for Programme (July 1999)
Chief Secretary (April 2003)

USA National Headquarters

National Chief Secretary (July 2006)

International Headquarters

International Secretary for Americas & Caribbean (July 2007)

USA Central Territory

Territorial Commander (October 2008)

International Headquarters

Chief of the Staff (May 2010)

USA Eastern Territory

Territorial Commander (February 2013)

References

http://www.salvationist.org/intnews.nsf/vw_web_articles/3DE0F910E6A7E0378025766B004C2A8E?opendocument
http://www.salvationarmy.org/ihq/www_sa.nsf/vw-search/8EDAD635A563E7B180257826003A055D?opendocument

Salvation Army officers
American Salvationists
People from Chicago
Living people
1950 births